Bryan Anthony Poston, Sr. (March 11, 1924 – October 4, 2009) was an American politician and businessman.

Background

Poston was born in Benson, Louisiana to Charles and Marjorie Poston. He went to Louisiana State University. He served in the United States Army Air Forces during World War II as an Aerial Engineer Gunner Sgt. on a B-17 Bomber. Later, he served in the Louisiana Senate from 1964 until 1991.

Poston lived with his wife and family in Hornbeck, Louisiana and was a businessman. He retired in 1991 and died with Alzheimer's disease in Many, Louisiana.

References

1924 births
2009 deaths
Democratic Party Louisiana state senators
People from Vernon Parish, Louisiana
20th-century American businesspeople
Baptists from Louisiana
United States Army personnel of World War II
Louisiana State University alumni
Neurological disease deaths in Louisiana
Deaths from Alzheimer's disease
United States Army Air Forces soldiers
Burials in Louisiana
20th-century American politicians
People from DeSoto Parish, Louisiana
20th-century Baptists